Clearwater County is a county in the northwestern part of the U.S. state of Minnesota. As of the 2020 census, the population was 8,524. Its county seat is Bagley.

Clearwater County is home to Lake Itasca, the source of the Mississippi River. Parts of the Red Lake and White Earth Indian reservations extend into the county.

Geography
The Red Lake River flows west out of Red Lake across the top of Clearwater County on its way to discharge into the Red River at Grand Forks, North Dakota. The Clearwater River flows west-southwest across the central part of the county on its way to discharge into the Red Lake River. The county terrain consists of wooded rolling hills, dotted with lakes and ponds. The terrain slopes to the north, with the highest point on the lower west boundary, at 1,781' (543m) ASL. The county's high point, just south of Scoop Lake, is one of a few places to exceed 2000 feet in Minnesota, rising to 2005 feet at 47.2318°N, -95.5034°W.

Major highways

  U.S. Highway 2
  Minnesota State Highway 1
  Minnesota State Highway 92
  Minnesota State Highway 113
  Minnesota State Highway 200
  Minnesota State Highway 223

Adjacent counties

 Beltrami County - northeast
 Hubbard County - southeast
 Becker County - south
 Mahnomen County - southwest
 Polk County - west
 Pennington County - northwest

Protected areas

 Bagley Lake State Wildlife Management Area
 Clearwater State Wildlife Management Area
 Iron Springs Bog Scientific and Natural Area
 Itasca State Park (part)
 Jackson Lake State Wildlife Management Area
 Little Pine State Wildlife Management Area
 Lower Rice Lake State Wildlife Management Area
 Old Red Lake Trail State Wildlife Management Area
 Upper Rice Lake State Wildlife Management Area

Climate and weather

Demographics

2000 census
As of the 2000 census there were 8,423 people, 3,330 households, and 2,287 families in the county. The population density was 8.43/sqmi (3.26/km2). There were 4,114 housing units at an average density of 4.12/sqmi (1.59/km2). The racial makeup of the county was 89.26% White, 0.19% Black or African American, 8.58% Native American, 0.25% Asian, 0.01% Pacific Islander, 0.24% from other races, and 1.47% from two or more races. 0.77% of the population were Hispanic or Latino of any race. 43.6% were of Norwegian, 15.6% German, 6.5% Swedish, and 6.2% American ancestry.

There were 3,330 households, out of which 30.60% had children under the age of 18 living with them, 56.80% were married couples living together, 7.50% had a female householder with no husband present, and 31.30% were non-families. 27.90% of all households were made up of individuals, and 14.50% had someone living alone who was 65 years of age or older. The average household size was 2.48 and the average family size was 3.02.

The county population contained 26.00% under the age of 18, 7.60% from 18 to 24, 24.60% from 25 to 44, 24.30% from 45 to 64, and 17.50% who were 65 years of age or older. The median age was 40 years. For every 100 females there were 101.10 males. For every 100 females age 18 and over, there were 100.30 males.

The median income for a household in the county was $30,517, and the median income for a family was $39,698. Males had a median income of $29,338 versus $20,417 for females. The per capita income for the county was $15,694. About 11.00% of families and 15.10% of the population were below the poverty line, including 18.90% of those under age 18 and 18.20% of those age 65 or over.

2020 Census

Communities

Cities

 Bagley (county seat)
 Clearbrook
 Gonvick
 Leonard
 Shevlin

Census-designated places

 Ebro
 Elbow Lake
 Rice Lake
 Roy Lake
 South End

Unincorporated communities

 Alida
 Big Bear Landing
 Bonga Landing
 Bush Landing
 Lake Itasca
 Mallard
 Ponsford Landing
 Vern
 Weme
 Zerkel

Townships

 Bear Creek Township
 Clover Township
 Copley Township
 Dudley Township
 Eddy Township
 Falk Township
 Greenwood Township
 Hangaard Township
 Holst Township
 Itasca Township
 La Prairie Township
 Leon Township
 Long Lost Lake Township
 Minerva Township
 Moose Creek Township
 Nora Township
 Pine Lake Township
 Popple Township
 Rice Township
 Shevlin Township
 Sinclair Township
 Winsor Township

Unorganized territories
 North Clearwater
 South Clearwater

Government and politics
Clearwater County was long a swing precinct (from 1968 through 2020, the Republican presidential candidate won 58% of the time), but no Democratic presidential candidate has carried the county since 1996.

See also
 National Register of Historic Places listings in Clearwater County MN

References

External links
 Clearwater County government website
 City of Bagley website

 
Minnesota counties
Minnesota counties on the Mississippi River
1902 establishments in Minnesota
Populated places established in 1902